The 2009 European Women Sevens Championship was the seventh edition of the European Women's Sevens Championship.

F-EN Tournament 2009
Date/Venue: 7 March 2009 at Ljubljana, Slovenia
Participants: Austria, Hungary, Croatia and Slovenia, with guests Bosnia-Herzogovina and Serbia
Slovenia 7-45 Croatia
Austria 19-12 Hungary
Slovenia 0-35 Austria
Croatia 33-0 Hungary
Slovenia 5-29 Hungary
Croatia 17-12 Austria

F-EN Tournament 2009
Date/Venue: 21 March 2009, Zagreb, Croatia

Participants: Austria, Hungary, Croatia and Slovenia, with guests Bosnia-Herzogovina and Serbia

Europe Emerging Nations 2009
Date/Venue: April 12, 2009 at Zanka, Hungary.
After a training camp, a tournament was played.  Initially it was expected that Serbia, Czech Republic, Finland (development team), Poland, Austria, Bulgaria, Bosnia Herzegovina, Croatia and Hungary, possibly Slovenia would take part.

Pool Stages
Group A

Finland 26-0 European Mix
Austria 12-7 Poland
Austria 31-5 European Mix
Finland 5-10 Poland
Poland 54-0 European Mix
Finland 7-12 Austria
Group B

Czech Republic 14-14 Hungary
Croatia 5-5 Bosnia Herzogovina
Croatia 14-14 Hungary
Czech Republic 7-12 Bosnia Herzogovina
Bosnia Herzogovina 7-17 Hungary
Czech Republic 14-12 Croatia

Classification Stages 
Bowl Semi-finals
Finland 5-0 Croatia
Bosnia Herzogovina 5-0 European Mix
Cup and Plate Semi-finals
Austria 0-19 Czech Republic
Hungary 21-14 Poland
7th place
Croatia 40-0 European Mix
Bowl Final
Finland 5-0 Bosnia Herzogovina
Plate Final
Austria 7-14 Poland
Cup Final
Czech Republic 14-26 Hungary

FIRA-AER Tournament 2009 - Division B 
Venue/Date: 6–7 June 2009, Zenica, Bosnia-Herzegovina. This was replaced in 2008 by World Cup qualifying. Slovenia, Ukraine, Georgia, Slovakia and Greece were expected to join this tournament in 2008. The plans of Slovakia and Greece aren't yet known. (Source Fira-Aer)

Pool Stages
Group A

Slovenia 0-34 Poland
Denmark 17-14 Georgia
Poland 17-7 Luxembourg
Denmark 31-0 Slovenia
Georgia 12-10 Luxembourg
Poland 34-5 Denmark
Georgia 33-5 Slovenia
Denmark 17-0 Luxembourg
Poland 15-12 Georgia
Luxembourg 10-10 Slovenia
Group B

Ukraine 0-24 Switzerland
Serbia 0-29 Hungary
Switzerland 42-0 Bosnia & Herzegovina
Serbia 0-41 Ukraine
Hungary 12-0 Bosnia & Herzegovina
Switzerland 51-0 Serbia
Hungary 26-0 Ukraine
Bosnia & Herzegovina 0-33 Ukraine
Switzerland 32-0 Hungary
Serbia 5-10 Bosnia & Herzegovina

Classification Stages
Plate Semis
Georgia 14-5 Bosnia Herzogovina
Luxembourg 0-5 Ukraine
Cup Semis
Poland 21-12 Hungary
Denmark 0-39 Switzerland
Bowl Final
Slovenia 36-5 Serbia
7th Place
Luxembourg 5-0 Bosnia Herzogovina
Plate Final
Ukraine 10-7 Georgia
3rd place
Hungary 22-10 Denmark
Cup Final
Poland 0-37 Switzerland

F-EN Finals 2009

27 and 28 June 2009 at Vienna, Austria

Participants are Austria, Hungary, Croatia and Slovenia, with guests Bosnia & Herzegovina and Serbia

FIRA-AER Tournament 2009 - Division A 
Venue/Date: 4–5 July 2009, Bruges, Belgium.
Group A consists of Finland, Israel, Czech Republic, Latvia, Croatia, Belgium B (replacing Lithuania).
Group B consists of Andorra, Romania, Bulgaria, Malta, Belgium, Austria.

Pool Stages
Group A

Czech Republic 33-0 Belgium B
Israel 10-7 Latvia
Finland 43-0 Croatia
Latvia 0-10 Belgium B
Czech Republic 14-0 Croatia
Finland 20-0 Israel
Croatia 0-27 Belgium B
Finland 10-5 Latvia
Israel 0-12 Czech Republic
Latvia 10-10 Croatia
Israel 17-0 Belgium B
Finland 28-0 Czech Republic
Israel 5-0 Croatia
Czech Republic 21-0 Latvia
Finland 24-0 Belgium B
Group B

Bulgaria 7-19 Austria
Romania 5-5 Malta
Andorra 0-5 
Malta 5-7 Austria
Bulgaria 0-24 
Andorra 7-14 Romania
 15-0 Austria
Andorra 0-19 Malta
Romania 31-0 Bulgaria
Malta 17-0 
Romania 17-7 Austria
Andorra 12-10 Bulgaria
Romania 0-12 
Bulgaria 0-36 Malta
Andorra 0-22 Austria

Classification Stages
Bowl Semi-final
Latvia 5-17 Bulgaria
Croatia 0-19 Andorra
Plate Semi-final
Israel 0-17 Austria
Belgium B 10-0 Romania
Cup Semi-final
Finland 31-0 Malta
Czech Republic 19-7 Belgium
11th Place
Latvia 10-0 Croatia
Bowl Final
Bulgaria 0-7 Andorra
7th Place
Israel 10-0 Romania
Plate Final
Austria 24-10 Belgium B
3rd Place
Malta 14-5 Belgium
Cup Final
Finland 29-0 Czech Republic

FIRA-AER Tournament 2009 - Top 10 
Venue/Date: 11–12 July, Hanover, Germany.
Participants were Italy, Spain, Germany, France, Portugal, Netherlands, Sweden, England, Russia, Moldova

Pool Stages
Pool A

Portugal 0-34 England
Spain 14-0 France
England 7-0 Sweden
Spain 12-0 Portugal
France 40-12 Sweden
England 24-0 Spain
France 12-12 Portugal
Spain 17-0 Sweden
England 22-5 France
Sweden 5-24 Portugal
Pool B

Moldova 0-26 Netherlands
Russia 12-5 Italy
Netherlands 19-0 Germany
Russia 22-0 Moldova
Italy 0-14 Germany
Netherlands 31-12 Russia
Italy 17-0 Moldova
Russia 10-12 Germany
Netherlands 35-7 Italy
Germany 24-7 Moldova

Classification Stages
Plate Semi-final
France 21-10 Italy
Portugal 17-7 Russia
Cup Semi-final
England 44-0 Germany
Spain 12-7 Netherlands
Bowl Final
Sweden 27-7 Moldova
7th Place
Italy 7-26 Russia
Plate Final
France 19-0 Portugal
3rd Place
Netherlands 35-10 Germany
Cup Final
England 20-12 Spain

Europe Emerging Nations Tournament
26 September 2009 in Slovenia
Slovenia 0-28 Hungary
Hungary 31-7 Austria
Austria bt Slovenia
Hungary 35-0 Slovenia
Austria bt Slovenia
Hungary 19-19 Austria

References

External links
 FIRA-AER Flashinfo N°104 - 31/08/2009

Rugby Europe Women's Sevens
2009 rugby sevens competitions
Sevens
Sevens